Chance Dylan Casey (born March 11, 1991) is an American football cornerback who is currently a free agent. He played college football at Baylor University, and signed with the Oakland Raiders as an undrafted free agent in 2013. Casey has also been a member of the San Francisco 49ers and Indianapolis Colts.

Professional career

Oakland Raiders

On September 2, 2013, Casey was signed by the Oakland Raiders to the practice squad, after going undrafted in the 2013 NFL Draft. On December 7, 2013, Casey was elevated to the active roster. On August 30, 2014, he was waived by the Raiders.

San Francisco 49ers

On September 1, 2014, Casey was signed to the 49ers practice squad. On September 15, 2014, he was released from the practice squad. On November 4, 2014, he was re-signed to the practice squad.

Second stint with Raiders

On December 16, 2014, Casey was signed from the 49ers practice squad. On May 11, 2015, he was waived by the Raiders.

Indianapolis Colts

On May 26, 2015, Casey was signed by the Colts. On September 5, 2015, he was waived by the Colts.

Cleveland Browns

On October 28, 2015, Casey was signed by the Browns to the practice squad.

Jacksonville Jaguars
On February 16, 2016, Casey was signed by the Jacksonville Jaguars, and was waived by the team on May 11, 2016.

References

External links
 Oakland Raiders bio
 Baylor Bears bio

1991 births
Living people
American football cornerbacks
Baylor Bears football players
Indianapolis Colts players
Oakland Raiders players
San Francisco 49ers players
Jacksonville Jaguars players